The AFC and OFC Zone A of 1974 FIFA World Cup qualification was contested between 7 AFC and OFC members.

Classification matches

 

 

Based on the results, South Vietnam, Japan and Hong Kong were placed in Group 1, while Thailand, Israel and Malaysia were placed in Group 2 with Korea Republic.

Group 1

 

 

Hong Kong and Japan advanced to the Zone A Semifinals.

Group 2

 

 

 

 

 

Israel and Korea Republic advanced to the Zone A Semifinals.

Semifinals

 

Korea Republic and Israel advanced to the Zone A Final.

Final

Korea Republic advanced to the Final Round.

External links
 RSSSF Page
 Naver News Library Page

A
Qual